Independent Workers Union may refer to:
Independent Workers' Union of Great Britain
Independent Workers Union of Ireland
Nepal Independent Workers Union